Taradale may refer to:

 Taradale, Calgary, Canada
 Taradale, New Zealand
 Taradale, Victoria, Australia